is a Japanese voice actress from Chiba Prefecture who is affiliated with Clare Voice. She is known for her roles as Sonoka Watarai in Warlords of Sigrdrifa and Snow in Combatants Will Be Dispatched!.

Filmography

Anime

2018
Goblin Slayer as Adventurer, Cowgirl's mother (episode 2), Female warrior (episode 11)

2019
Domestic Girlfriend as Child B (episode 8), Rika
BanG Dream! as Girl
Persona 5: The Animation as Passerby B
How Heavy Are the Dumbbells You Lift? as Female student (episode 8)
We Never Learn as Child

2020
Muhyo & Roji's Bureau of Supernatural Investigation as Ai (episodes 14–15)
Wandering Witch: The Journey of Elaina as Salesperson (episode 7)
Warlords of Sigrdrifa as Sonoka Watarai
The Irregular at Magic High School: Visitor Arc as New Breed Front magician (episode 12); New Breed Front member (episode 13)

2021
Otherside Picnic as Child (episode 3)
Combatants Will Be Dispatched! as Snow
I've Been Killing Slimes for 300 Years and Maxed Out My Level as Natalie
Osamake as Penguin (episode 1)
The Aquatope on White Sand as Child (episode 5), Ruka Suroi
The Case Study of Vanitas as Catherine (episodes 4, 6)
The Vampire Dies in No Time as Hiroshi Yokota

2023
Ningen Fushin: Adventurers Who Don't Believe in Humanity Will Save the World as Curran

References

External links
Agency profile 

Japanese voice actresses
Living people
Voice actresses from Chiba Prefecture
Year of birth missing (living people)